"Fahr mit mir (4x4)" is a single from German indie band Kraftklub's fourth studio album Kargo, featuring a guest appearance from German rock band Tokio Hotel. It was released on July 8, 2022.

Music video
The music video shows Kraftklub in a room singing the song whilst the camera is rotating counter-clockwise and zooming out to show Bill and Tom Kaulitz sitting in a Lada Niva 4x4, the name of which is included in the lyrics. The band are eventually seen singing and dancing around the 4x4. Later shots show the 4x4 rolling over with Kaulitz and two members of the band inside. The 4x4 is seen driving around with a white flag attached to the rear with Kaulitz and Felix Brummer singing by the side of it.

Track listing
Digital download

Charts

Release history

References

2022 songs
Tokio Hotel songs